The 2019 ICF World Junior and U23 Canoe Slalom Championships took place in Kraków, Poland from 16 to 21 July 2019 under the auspices of the International Canoe Federation (ICF) at the Kraków-Kolna Canoe Slalom Course. It was the 21st edition of the competition for Juniors (U18) and the 8th edition for the Under 23 category.

A total of 22 medal events took place, 11 in each of the two age categories.

Medal summary

Men

Canoe

Junior

U23

Kayak

Junior

U23

Women

Canoe

Junior

U23

Kayak

Junior

U23

Mixed

Canoe

Junior

U23

Medal table

References

External links
International Canoe Federation

ICF World Junior and U23 Canoe Slalom Championships
World Junior and U23 Canoe Slalom Championships
World Junior and U23 Canoe Slalom Championships
World Junior and U23 Canoe Slalom Championships